Elizabeth Brister Banks (May 2, 1865 – July 18, 1938) was an American journalist and author. Although she never renounced her American citizenship, she remained in England throughout the last forty years of her life.

Biography
Elizabeth was born in Trenton, New Jersey, the daughter of John Banks and Sarah Ann Brister. As a young child, she was raised by her aunt Elizabeth Brister and uncle Joseph Peck on "the experimental farm" north of Madison, Wisconsin, near Deansville. She attended Milwaukee Downer Female Seminary College in Milwaukee when it was still located at Fox Lake, Wisconsin.

She became a typewriter girl in a grocery store, then worked society pages in Baltimore and Saint Paul, Minnesota. She worked as secretary at the American Consulate in Peru, later becoming a stunt girl journalist when other women writers were relegated to society and fashion pages.

In London, she became a regular contributor to publications such as The Daily News, Punch, St James' Gazette, London Illustrated, and Referee. She created a sensation in London by recording her observations on the plight of the lower classes, which she researched posing as a housemaid, street sweeper, and Covent Garden flower girl. Her journalistic writing under several pen names including pseudonyms of Mary Mortimer Maxwell and Enid, unceasingly promoted women's right to vote and denounced prison conditions for jailed suffragettes.

Elizabeth lived in London at 17 Downing Street, close to the Prime Minister's residence. Her neighbors and friends included George Bernard Shaw, John Galsworthy, Thomas Hardy, H. G. Wells and suffragette Henrietta Marston. She  made major contributions to British Intelligence in developing strategies to help protect London from German aerial attacks and developing propaganda schemes that helped draw the United States into the first world war. According to Who's Who in America (volume 20, 1938) "in 1914 she founded the Authors' Belgian Fund and Dirk's fund for the Allies. She originated and also wrote a series of controversial essays entitled The Lady at the Round Table".

She made a trip back to the United States and became the author of an autobiographical work, The Remaking of an American (1928). She also wrote "Campaigns of Curiosity" (1894) and "Autobiography of a Newspaper Girl" (1902). Careful to protect her sources in both her letters and written works, the bulk of her personal papers were destroyed upon her death. She died on 18 July 1938 of arteriosclerosis, then was cremated and her ashes deposited at Golders Green Crematorium.

Notes

References

Sources

External links
 
 Biodata

1872 births
1938 deaths
American expatriates in England
Journalists from London
Writers from Trenton, New Jersey
19th-century American newspaper people
American women journalists
19th-century American women writers